"Travessia", known in the English version as "Bridges" is a 1967 composition by Milton Nascimento and Fernando Brant, with English lyrics added in 1969 by Gene Lees. The song is the title track of Nascimento's 1967 album Travessia.

"Travessia" won second prize at the 2nd International Song Festival at Rio de Janeiro in October 1967, and was immediately offered for pressing and rights in America. The English version was recorded by artists including Tony Bennett on his 1975 album Life Is Beautiful and released as the B-side of "As Time Goes By".  It was also covered by Sergio Mendes on his 1978 studio album "Brasil '88" and Susannah McCorkle on her 1990 CD Sábia.

References

1967 songs
Bossa nova songs
Brazilian songs
Songs with lyrics by Gene Lees